Luis García Silva (born 3 March 1968) is a Mexican politician from the Institutional Revolutionary Party. From 2011 to 2012 he served as Deputy of the LXI Legislature of the Mexican Congress representing Quintana Roo.

References

1968 births
Living people
Politicians from Quintana Roo
People from Chetumal, Quintana Roo
Institutional Revolutionary Party politicians
21st-century Mexican politicians
Deputies of the LXI Legislature of Mexico
Members of the Chamber of Deputies (Mexico) for Quintana Roo
20th-century Mexican people